Between 20 August and 19 October 1944, 168 Allied airmen were held prisoner at Buchenwald concentration camp. Colloquially, they described themselves as the KLB Club (from ). Of them, 166 airmen survived Buchenwald, while two died of sickness at the camp.

Background
As Allied air forces took control of the skies over Europe in the summer of 1944, Adolf Hitler ordered the immediate execution of Allied flyers accused of committing certain acts. The most common act was to be captured in civilian clothing or without their dog tags by the Gestapo or secret police.  These airmen had been shot down mainly over France, but also over Belgium and the Netherlands and were turned over to the Gestapo and secret police – by traitors within the French Resistance – while attempting to reach England along escape routes such as the Comet and Pat lines. A notable traitor within the French Resistance was Jacques Desoubrie, who was responsible for betraying a significant number of Allied airmen to the German authorities.

These captured airmen were given the name "Terrorflieger" (terror flyers), and were not given trials. The German Foreign Office however, expressed concern about shooting prisoners of war (POWs) and suggested that enemy airmen suspected of such offenses not be given the legal status of POWs. Following this advice, the Gestapo and security police informed these captured Allied airmen that they were criminals and spies. Using this justification, 168 allied airmen from Great Britain, United States, Australia, Canada, New Zealand and Jamaica were taken by train – in overcrowded cattle boxcars – from Fresnes Prison outside Paris, to Buchenwald concentration camp.  After five days in the boxcars, they arrived at Buchenwald on 20 August 1944.

Buchenwald

Buchenwald was a forced labour camp of about 60,000 inmates of mainly Russian POWs, but also common criminals; religious prisoners, including Jews; and various political prisoners from Germany, France, Poland, and Czechoslovakia. For the first three weeks at Buchenwald, the prisoners were totally shaven, denied shoes, and forced to sleep outside without shelter in one of Buchenwald's sub-camps, known as "Little Camp". Most airmen doubted they would ever get out of Buchenwald because their documents were stamped with the acronym "DIKAL", or "allowed in no other camp". After the war some of the airmen recounted that officers of the German Air Force had visited Buchenwald a few days after an Allied air raid on Weimar in late August 1944 to assess the damage inflicted upon the armament factory adjacent to the camp. According to these recollections the German officers talked to the airmen and saw that they were transferred to the POW camp. Years later veterans identified Johannes Trautloft from photos as one of the officers and credited him with saving their lives.
Until now it was not possible to verify this story with archival records. In his war diary Trautloft does not mention the events. The Gedenkstätte Buchenwald stated that a visit by Trautloft or other officers might have happened and that this might have influenced the decision making process of what to do with the airmen. However, there might have been no connection whatsoever, because the decisions were not made by a single officer like Trautloft.

To address the constant stress, long appells (roll calls), boredom, insecurity and apprehension, it was decided amongst the 168 airmen to hold formal meetings to give them a sense of purpose and order. Thus, the exclusive KLB Club came into existence with several chapters; Canada, United States, Great Britain, and Australia-New Zealand. Elected representatives of each nationality held separate meetings to collate the previously scattered efforts of those who had proposed address lists, meetings after the war and other pursuits. The meetings at Buchenwald displayed the 168 airmen's militariness and solidarity, forming a bond that brings them together more than 60 years after the liberation of Buchenwald.

At one meeting, it was agreed to design a club pin. The winning design, put forward by Bob Taylor from Great Britain, showed a naked, winged foot, symbolising the airmen's barefoot condition while in the concentration camp. The foot is chained to a ball bearing the letters KLB, with the whole mounted on a white star, which was the crest of the Allied invasion forces. Canadian airman, William Arthur “Willie” Waldram, also wrote the poem titled, A Reflection, about Buchenwald (see below). On the night of 19 October, 156 of the 168 airmen were transferred from Buchenwald to Stalag Luft III by the Luftwaffe.  Two airmen died from sickness at Buchenwald, while the remaining 10 were transported in small groups, over a period of several weeks.

In the book 168 Jump Into Hell, the purpose of the KLB Club was described as being to perpetuate the comradeship already shown by the flying personnel of Great Britain, Australia, New Zealand, United States and Canada, by the interchanging of pamphlets, ideas and visits. More than 30 years later, in 1979, four Canadian KLB members made the first serious attempt to trace all club members. At that time, of the original 168 members, only 28 had not been located or accounted for.. All have now been traced, and information about each individual airman, including service history, is now being posted at www.buchenwaldairmen.info. As of June 2021, three of the airmen were still alive (Booker, Hilding, and Bauder), however the last surviving airman, Ret. 2Lt. Russell Hilding, died on November 7, 2021 aged 100.

Members

References

Bibliography
 .
 .
 .
Martini, Frederic H (2017). Betrayed; Secrecy, Lies, and Consequences. ISBN  978-0996636353

Buchenwald concentration camp survivors
World War II prisoners of war held by Germany
Prisoners of war